"High We Exalt Thee, Realm of the Free" is the national anthem of Sierra Leone. Written by Clifford Nelson Fyle and composed by John Akar in a nationwide competition, it was adopted in 1961 when the country became independent from the United Kingdom, replacing "God Save The Queen". The Constitution of Sierra Leone, 1991, makes it the responsibility of every citizen of Sierra Leone to "respect its ideals and its institutions", including the national anthem.

Lyrics
The anthem consists of three verses, each ending with the phrase "Land that we love, our Sierra Leone."

References

External links
 Sierra Leone: "High We Exalt Thee, Realm of the Free" - Audio of the national anthem of Sierra Leone, with information and lyrics
 National anthem of Sierra Leone MIDI

African anthems
Sierra Leonean music
National symbols of Sierra Leone
National anthem compositions in G major